Jones Branch is a  long first-order tributary to Marshyhope Creek in Sussex County, Delaware.

Course
Jones Branch rises on the Bridgeville Branch divide at Jacobs Crossroads, Delaware, and then flows generally northwest to join Marshyhope Creek about 1-mile east of Smithville, Maryland.

Watershed
Jones Branch drains  of area, receives about 44.7 in/year of precipitation, and is about 26.06% forested.

See also
List of rivers of Delaware

References

Rivers of Delaware
Rivers of Sussex County, Delaware